Samaritaine is a Charleroi Metro station, located in the northeastern end of Charleroi downtown, in fare zone 1. Samaritaine is an underground station featuring a central platform, with street access at both ends.

While trams drive on the right on most of the Charleroi Pre-metro network, they drive on the left on the Gilly line, of which Samaritaine is part. The change of side occurs between Waterloo and Samaritaine.

Nearby points of interest 

  Ville 2 shopping mall.
 Pathé Charleroi (cinema), formerly named cinepointcom, formerly named Carolywood (largest cinema in Charleroi).
 High schools in the vicinity.

Transfers 

There are no direct bus transfers at this station.

Charleroi Metro stations
Railway stations opened in 1992